This is a list of monarchs who were deposed in the 19th century.

A

Afghanistan
Zaman Shah, deposed 1801.
Mahmud Shah Durrani, deposed 1803, reinstated 1809, redeposed 1818.
Shoja Shah, deposed 1809, reinstated 1839
Dost Mohammad Khan, deposed 1839, reinstated 1842.
Wazir Akbar Khan, retired 1843.
Sher Ali Khan, deposed 1866, reinstated 1868.
Mohammad Yaqub Khan, deposed 1879
Ayub Khan, deposed 1880

Algeria
Hussein ben Hassan, dey of Algeria, surrendered to invading French forces on 5 July 1830.

Alt-Leiningen
Christian Karl of Alt-Leiningen, Count of Alt-Leiningen 1770–1801. Deposed or abdicated 1801.  Died 1803.

amaGaza
Mawewe Nxumalo, Nkosi of amaGaza 11 Oct 1858 – 18??, deposed or abdicated 18??, restored 18??, reigned until 1862.
Mzila Nxumalo, Nkosi of amaGaza, deposed or abdicated 18??, restored 1862, reigned until August 1884.

Antakarana
Tsialana II, King of Antakarana, deposed 1895.

Aremberg
Ludwig Engelbert, Duke of Aremberg (Herzog von Aremberg) 1778–1801, deposed or abdicated 1801. Died 1820.
Prosper Ludwig, Duke of Aremberg (Herzog von Aremberg) 1802–1810, deposed or abdicated 1810. Died 1861.

Bishopric of Augsburg
Klemens Wenzeslaus von Sachsen Prince-Bishop of Augsburg, deposed 1802 upon Augsburg's annexation by Bavaria, died 1812.

Austria
Emperor Ferdinand I, abdicated 1848.

B

Grand Duchy of Baden
Ludwig II, Grand Duke of Baden, abdicated 1856

Bahrain
Shaikh Muhammad bin Khalifa al-Khalifa, deposed 1868.

Bajini
Hashimu bin Ahmed 3 times sultan of Bajini, 18xx–18xx, 18xx–1886, 1889

Baku Khanate
Husayn Quli Khan, Khan of Baku, deposed due to Russian annexation, 1806.

Balasinor
Nawab Shri Muhammad 'Abid Khan Naver Khan Babi, Nawab Sahib of Balasinor 1820–1822, deposed 1822

Bambao
Ahmed bin Shekhe Ngome sultan of Bambao reigned 4 times, in the 19th century
Abdallah bin Saidi Hamza sultan of Bambao 3 times in the 19th century
Mohamed bin Ahmed of Bambao sultan of Bambao for 2 times in the 19th century
Mwenye Mji sultan of Bambao for 2 times in the 19th century.
Saidi Bakari bin Ahmed sultan of Bambao for 2 times in the 19th century.

Prince-Bishopric of Bamberg
Christoph Franz von Buseck, Prince–Bishop of Bamberg (Fürstbishof zu Bamberg), deposed in 1802 due to Bamberg's annexation by Bavaria, died 1805.

Banganapalle
Nawab Sayyid Husain Ali II Khan Bahadur, Jagirdar of Banganapalle.  Deposed 1832, restored 1848.

Baoni
Sahib Jah, Azam ul-Umara, Rashid ul-Mulk, 'Imad ud-Daula, Nawab Mir Mehdi Husain Khan Bahadur, Firuz Jang, Nawab of Baoni 1859–1883, abdicated in favour of his son, died 1895.

Kingdom of Bavaria
Ludwig I, King of Bavaria 1825–1848, abdicated 1848, died 1868.

Berg and Cleves
Wilhelm, Duke of Berg and Cleves, deposed 1806
Joachim Murat, Grand Duke of Berg, abdicated 1808.
Napoleon Louis Bonaparte, Grand Duke of Berg 1809–1813, deposed 1813.

Birkenfeld
Wilhelm, Count Palatine of Birkenfeld, deposed due to Birkenfeld's annexation by France, 1801

Boina Kingdom
Andriantsoly, King of Boina, deposed or abdicated 1832
Tsiomeko, Queen of Boina, deposed 1840.

Bora Bora
Princess Ari'i-'Otare Teari'i-maeva-rua II, deposed by the French, 19 March 1888.

Barotseland

Lubosi I, Litunga of the Lozi and Paramount Chief of Barotseland, deposed 1884, restored 1885, died 1916.
Akafuna Tatila, Litunga of the Lozi and Paramount Chief of Barotseland, deposed 1885, died 1887.

Bone state
La Mappatunru To' Wappatunru' Paduka Sri Sultan Muhammad Ismail Mukhtaj ud-din (MatinroE-ri Lalang-bata), Arumpone of Bone 1812–1823, deposed or abdicated 1823, d.1825

Empire of Brazil
King João VI, lost the crown 1822.
Emperor Pedro I, abdicated 1831.
Emperor Pedro II, deposed 1889.

Brakna
Sidi Mukhtar wuld Sidi Muhammad emir of Brakna 1841–1843, deposed or abdicated 1843.

Brunswick
Frederick William, Duke of Brunswick-Lüneburg, duke of Brunswick 1806–1807, deposed 1807, restored 1813
Charles II, Duke of Brunswick-Lüneburg, duke of Brunswick 1815–1831, deposed 1831, died 1873

Buganda
Mwanga II Kabaka of Buganda 1884–1888 and 1889–1897, died 1897
Kalema Kabaka of Buganda 1888–1889, died 1890

Bunyoro 
Chwa II Kabarega ruler of Bunyoro 1869–1873, died 1898

Burma
Bagyidaw, King of Burma, deposed 1837.
Pagan Min II, King of Burma, abdicated 1853.
Thibaw Min, King of Burma, deposed 1885.

C

Cambodia
Ang Duong II, deposed 1844, reinstated 1845, d.1860.
Queen Ba-cong-chua, deposed 1841, reinstated 1844, redeposed 1845.

Chitral
Mehtar Sher Afzal, Mehtar of Chitral and Yasin, deposed 1893
Mehtar Muhammad Amir ul-Mulk, Mehtar of Chitral and Yasin, deposed 1895

Prince-Bishopric of Constance
Karl Theodor Anton Maria Freiherr von Dalberg, Prince-Bishop of Constance, deposed due to annexation by Baden, 1802

Imperial Abbey of Corvey
Ferdinand Freiherr von Lüning, Prince-Bishop of Corvey, deposed due to the annexation of the state by the Prince of Orange-Nassau in 1802

Croy-Dülmen
August, Count of Croy-Dülmen. Deposed due to the annexation of Croy-Dülmen by Arenberg in 1806

D

E

Egypt Eyalet
Muhammad 'Ali Pasha Vali of Egypt, abdicated 1848.
Ismail Pasha Khedive of Egypt, deposed 1879.

Prince-Bishopric of Eichstätt
Joseph Graf von Stubenberg, Prince-Bishop of Eichstätt, deposed 1802 when Eichstätt annexed by Bavaria.

Elchingen
Robert II Plersch, Abbot of Elchingen. Deposed 1803 following annexation by Bavaria.

Prince-Provostry of Ellwangen
Clemens Wenzel of Saxony, Prince-Provost of the College, deposed due to annexation by Württemberg, 1803

Essen Abbey
Maria Kunigunde Herzogin von Sachsen, Princess-Abbesse of Essen, deposed due to annexation by Prussia, 1802

Ethiopian Empire
Emperor Tekle Giyorgis I (Fakr Sagad), Elect of God and King of Kings of Ethiopia.  Succeeded on the deposition of Emperor Iyasu III, 24 April 1788. Deposed for a second time, 26 July 1789. Regained the throne by force of arms, January 1794. Deposed for the third time, 15 April 1795. Restored December 1795. Deposed for the fourth time, 20 May 1796. Restored again, 4 January 1798. Deposed for the fifth time, 20 May 1799. Restored, 24 March 1800 but was deposed for the sixth, and last time.
Demetros, installed 1799 and deposed 1800, reinstated 1800, deposed again 1801.
Yohannes III, installed 1840, deposed 1841, reinstated and redeposed 1845, rereinstated 1850, and reredeposed 1851.
Sahle Dengel, installed 1832, deposed 1840, restored 1841, deposed again 1845, reinstated again 1845, deposed again 1850, reinstated again 1851 and deposed a last time 1855.
 Emperor Tewodros II, died 1868.
 Emperor Tekle Giyorgis II was deposed in 1872 by Kassay Merca who was then proclaimed Emperor Yohannes IV.

F

France
Napoleon I, Emperor of the First French Empire, abdicated 1814, reinstated and deposed 1815.
Louis XVIII, deposed 1815, reinstated 1815.
Napoleon II deposed 1815
Charles X, abdicated 1830.
Louis XIX, abdicated 1830.
Henri V, deposed 1830.
Louis Philippe, abdicated 1848.
Napoleon III, deposed 1870.

Frankfurt
Carl Theodor Reichsfreiherr von Dalberg prince 1806–1810 and Grand Duke 1810–1813 of Frankfurt, deposed or abdicated 1813, died 1817.
Prince Eugène-Rose-Napoléon de Beauharnais prince de Venise grand duke of Frankfurt 1813, deposed or abdicated 1813, died 1824.

Prince-Bishopric of Freising
Joseph Konrad Graf von Schroffenberg-Mös, Prince-Bishop of Freising, annexed by Bavaria 1803

Freudenberg
Benedict Kirchner, Seigneur-Abbot of Freudenberg, annexed by France, 1801

Friedberg in der Wetterau
Clemens Augustus Freiherr von Westphalen zu Fürstenberg, Burggraf of Friedberg in der Watterau, lands annexed by Hesse-Darmstadt 1806

Imperial Abbey of Fulda
Adalbert III von Herstal, Prince-Bishop of Fulda. Deposed 1802.

Fürstenberg
Karl Egon, Prince of Fürstenberg, deposed through the annexation of Fürstenberg by Baden in 1806.  Died in 1854.

G

Gandersheim Abbey
Auguste Dorothea Herzogin von Braunschweig, Princess-Abbesse of Gandersheim, deposed in 1802 following the annexation of Gandersheim by the Duchy of Brunswick.

Ganja khanate
Javad Khan (1786–1804), deposed through the Russian annexation 1804.

Ghazni
Musa Jan Khan of Ghazni emir of Ghazni 1879–1880, deposed or abdicated 1880.

Greece
King Otto of Greece, deposed 1862

Guria
Vakhtang II Gurieli, Prince of Guria, deposed 1803.
David Gurieli, Prince of Guria, deposed 1829.

Gutenzell Abbey
Justina von Erolzheim Princess-Abbesse of Gutenzell 1776–1803, deposed through the annexation by Württemberg 1803, died 1809.

Gottschee
 Wilhelm I of Gottschee 1800–1809 and 1815–1822, lost his domain to Austria-Hungary, restored 1815, died 1822.

Gowa
Karaeng Pangkajena Paduka Sri Sultan 'Abdu'l Khalik ibnu Sultan Zain ud-din, Sultan of Gowa, deposed 1814
La Oddanriwu Karaeng Katangka Paduka Sri Sultan 'Abdu'l Rahman ibnu Sultan 'Abdu'l Rauf, Sultan of Gowa, installed and deposed 1825, d.1845

H

Haiti
Emperor Faustin I, deposed 1859.

Kingdom of Hanover
King George V deposed 1866, died 1878.

Kingdom of Hawaii
Queen Liliuokalani deposed 1893.

Emirate of Harar
`Abd Allah II ibn `Ali `Abd ash-Shakur, usurper, seized the throne 1884 (or 1885).  Deposed by Menelik II in 1887.

Monastic State of the Knights Hospitaller, Heitersheim
Ignaz Balthasar Willibald Rink von Baldenstein Prince-General Prior of Heitersheim 1796–1806, deposed through the annexation by Baden.

Herford Abbey
Friedrike Charlotte Leopoldine Luise Prinzessin von Brandenburg-Schwedt Princess-Abbesses of Herford 1764–1802, deposed through the annexation by Prussia, died 1808.

Electorate of Hesse
Wilhelm IX of Hesse-Kassel, Landgrave of Hesse-Kassel 1785–1803, then Elector and Sovereign Landgrave of Hesse-Kassel  1803–1807, deposed 1807, restored 1813, died 1821.
Friedrich Wilhelm I of Hesse Kassel Elector and Sovereign Landgrave of Hesse-Kassel 1847–1866, deposed 1866, died 1875.

Prince-Bishopric of Hildesheim
Franz Egon von Fürstenberg, prince-bishop of Hildesheim 1789–1802, deposed through the annexation by Prussia.

Hohengeroldseck
Philipp Franz Wilhelm Ignaz Peter count of Hohengeroldseck 1775–1806, promoted to prince 1806, deposed 1814 died 1829.

Hohenlohe-Langenburg
Karl Ludwig of Hohenlohe-Langenburg 1789–1806, deposed through the annexation by Baden 1806.

Hohenlohe-Ingelfingen
Friedrich Ludwig zu Hohenlohe-Ingelfingen prince of Hohenlohe-Ingelfingen 1796–1806, deposed through the annexation by Bavaria 1806.

Hohenlohe-Bartenstein
Ludwig Aloys Joachim of Hohenlohe-Bartenstein prince of Hohenlohe-Bartenstein, deposed through the annexation by Bavaria 1806.
Karl Joseph of Hohenlohe-Bartenstein prince of Hohenlohe-Bartenstein (in Jagstberg) 1798–1806, deposed through the annexation by Bavaria 1806.
Eduard of Hohenlohe-Bartenstein prince of Hohenlohe-Bartenstein (in Bartenstein), deposed through the annexation by Bavaria 1806.

Hohenlohe-Waldenburg-Schillingsfürst
Karl Albrecht III Philipp Josef prince of Hohenlohe-Waldenburg-Schillingsfürst 1796–1806, deposed through the annexation by Bavaria 1806.

Hohenzollern-Hechingen
Friedrich Wilhelm of Hohenzollern-Hechingen prince of Hohenzollern-Hechingen 1838–1850, abdicated 1850, died 1869.

Hohenzollern-Sigmaringen
Karl of Hohenzollern-Sigmaringen prince of Hohenzollern-Sigmaringen (Fürst von Hohenzollern zu Sigmaringen) 1831–1848, deposed or abdicated 1848, died 1853.
Karl Anton of Hohenzollern-Sigmaringen prince of Hohenzollern-Sigmaringen (Fürst von Hohenzollern zu Sigmaringen) 1848–1850, abdicated 1850, died 1885.

Holy Roman Empire
Francis II, Holy Roman Emperor, abdicated 1806

Holland
Louis I deposed 1810
Louis II deposed 1810, when Holland annexed by France.

Hsamönghkam
Maung Shwe E myosa of Hsamönghkam 1825–1834, deposed or abdicated 1834, restored 18xx, reigned until 1847.
Maung Me myosa of Hsamönghkam 1834–18xx, deposed or abdicated 18xx, restored 1847, reigned until 1848.
Maung Lin myosa of Hsamönghkam 1867, deposed or abdicated 1867, restored 1876, reigned until 18xx.
Maung Shwe Min myosa of Hsamönghkam 1848–1867, deposed or abdicated 1867, restored 1885, reigned until 1886.

Hsenwi
Sao Hseng Naw Hpa saopha of Hsenwi 1845–1848, deposed or abdicated 1848restored 1853, deposed or abdicated 1855, restored 1867, deposed or abdicated 1869, restored 1874, deposed or abdicated 1875, restored 1876, reigned until 1879.
Sao Hpa Mawng Hpa saopha of Hsenwi 1858–1860, deposed or abdicated 1860, restored 1863, deposed or abdicated 1864.

Huahine
King Ari'i-mate Te-uru-ra'i of Huahine, deposed 1868.
Queen Te-mari'i-a-Teurura'i Ma'i-hara Te-uhe of Huahine, deposed and fled to Tahiti, 1890.
Queen Teri'i-na-vaha-roa Teri'ita-ri'a Teha'apapa III of Huahine, deposed on the annexion of Huahine by France, September 1895.

Kingdom of Hungary
King Ferdinand V, abdicated 1848.
King Francis Joseph I, deposed 1849, restored later that year

I

County of Isenburg
Ernst Kasimir III count of Isenburg 1801–1810, deposed by the French occupation 1810.

Isenburg-Birstein
Karl I Friedrich Ludwig Moritz prince of Isenburg-Birstein 1803–1816, deposed 1816, died 1820.

Isenburg-Meerholz
Karl Ludwig Wilhelm, Count of Isenburg-Meerholz. Deposed or abdicated 1806.

Isenburg-Wächtersbach
Ludwig Maximilian II count of Isenburg-Wächtersbach 1805–1806, deposed 1806.

Itsandra
Musa Fumu wa Fey Fumu Sultan of Itsandra for 4 times in the 19th century.
Tibe Bamba Sultan of Itsandra for 4 times in the 19th century.

Imereti
King Solomon II, deposed after his kingdom was annexed by Russia, 20 February 1810.

Italy

King Umberto I was killed in 1900.

J

Jelebu
Dato' Mahmud alias Kulup Tunggal, 9th Dato' Mendika Mentri Akhir ul-Zaman and 11th Dato' Penghulu of Jelebu.

K

Kaisersheim Abbey
Franz Xaver Müller prince-abbot of Kaiserheim 1783–1803, deposed through the annexation by Bavaria.

Käppel
Marianne Antonia von Donop Princess-abbess of Käppel, deposed through the annexation by Nassau in 1803.

Kingdom of Kartli-Kakheti
King Giorgi XII, deposed 1800.

Karangasem
Sri Paduka Ratu Gusti Gedé Ngurah Agung Langang Paguyangan, Raja of Karangasem, deposed 1828.
Sri Paduka Ratu Gusti Ngurah Bagus Pañji Karangasem, Raja of Karangasem, deposed 1838.

Kasanzi
Mbumba of Kasanzi, Yaka of Kasanzi ?-1848, deposed or abdicated 1848, restored 1853 and reigned until ?

Kazembe
Kazembe IX Lukwesa Mpanga Mwata Kazembe of Kazembe 1872–1883, deposed or abdicated 1883, restored 1885, deposed, abdicated or died 1886.
Kazembe X Kanyembo Ntemena Mwata Kazembe of Kazembe 1883–1885, deposed of abdicated 1885, restored 1886, died 1904.

Imperial Ducal Abbey of Kempten
Castolus Reichlin von Meldegg-Amtezell prince-abbot of Kempten 1793–1803
deposed by the annexation by Bavaria.

Knyphausen
Wilhelm II Gustav Friedrich, Baron of Knyphausen. Deposed or abdicated 1810, restored 1813, re-deposed 1813, restored 1818.
Wilhelm III Friedrich Christian Graf von Aldenburg, Baron of Knyphausen. Deposed or abdicated 1854.

Cologne
Anton Victor Joseph Johann Raimund Erzherzog von Österreich, archduke of Cologne, deposed 1801, died 1835.

Kyawkku Hsiwan
Nga Shwe Maung I Ngwegunhmu of Kyawkku Hsiwan 1844–1852, deposed or abdicated 1852, restored 1856, reigned until 1863.

L

Laihka
Sao Hkam Mawng saopha of Laikha 1860–1862, deposed or abdicated 1862, restored 1868, reigned until 1879.

Lawksawk
Sao Waing saopha of Lawksawk 1854–1881, deposed or abdicated 1881, restored 1886, reigned until January 1887.

Lindau Abbey
Karl August Fürst von Bretzenheim count of Lindau 1803–1804, deposed 1804.

Loilong
Hkun Pu Ngwegunhmu of Loilong 1856–1880, deposed or abdicated 1880, died 1882.

Loimaw
Maung Shwe Pyi, Ngwegunhmu of Loimaw. Deposed 1874, restored 1886.

Lombardo-Veneto
Ferdinand I, abdicated 1848.
Franz Joseph I, lost Lombardy 1859, Venetia 1866 and gave up the title

Lozi
Mubukwanu Litunga of the Lozi ?-18th century, deposed in the 18th century.

Lübeck
Peter Friedrich Ludwig Herzog von Holstein-Gottorp archbishop (1785–1803) and prince of Lübeck 1803–1806, deposed or abdicated 1806, died 1829.

M

Kingdom of Madagascar
 Radama II was murdered in 1863.
Ranavalona III queen of Madagascar, deposed by the French 1897.

Archbishopric of Mainz
Carl Theodor Reichsfreiherr von Dalberg archbishop of Mainz 1802–1806, deposed or abdicated 1806, died 1817.

Sultanate of the Maldives
Sultan Muhammad Mu'in ud-din II, installed 1886, deposed 1888.
Sultan Ibrahim Nur ud-din II, installed 1882, deposed 1886, reinstated 1888.
Sultan Muhammad 'Imad ud-din V, installed 1892, deposed 1893.
Sultan Muhammad Shams ud-din III Iskander, deposed 1893, reinstated 1903, re-deposed 1934.

Mangareva
Bernardo Putairi, deposed 1881.

Manyika
Cikanga Nyarumwe II mambo of Manyika 1796–1807, deposed or abdicated 1807 restored 1818, reigned until 1822–

Mayotte
Andriantsoly of Mayotte sultan of Mayotte 1832–1833, deposed 1833, restored 1836, redeposed 1841, died 1845.

Mergentheim
Karl II Ludwig Johann Erzherzog von Österreich Prince-Grand Master of Mergentheim (Fürst und Hoch-und Deutschmeister des Deutschen Ordens in deutschen und wälschen Landen, Administratoren des Hochmeistertums in Preussen, Herrn zu Freudenthal und Eulenberg) 1801–1804, deposed or abdicated 1804, died 1847.
Anton Viktor Joseph Raymund Erzherzog von Österreich Prince-Grand master of Mergentheim (Fürst und Hoch-und Deutschmeister des Deutschen Ordens in deutschen und wälschen Landen, Administratoren des Hochmeistertums in Preussen, Herrn zu Freudenthal und Eulenberg) 1804–1809, deposed or abdicated 1809, died 1835.

Mexico
Agustín de Iturbide, deposed 1823.
Maximilian I of Mexico, deposed in 1867.

Mingrelia
Grigol VI Dadiani, deposed 1802, reinstated 1802.
Levanti V Dadiani, Duke of Mingrelia, abdicated 1840.
Nikolaoz, Duke of Mingrelia, abdicated 1867.

Duchy of Modena
Francis IV, Duke of Modena, deposed 1831, restored later that year
Francis V, Duke of Modena, deposed 1848, restored 1849, deposed again 1859.  His duchy was annexed by the Kingdom of Sardinia in 1860.

Mughal Empire
Bahadur Shah II, deposed 1858, dynasty prevails through Prince Mirza Nali

Mosquito Nation
George Augustus Frederic II, last King of the Miskito Kingdom, deposed 1860.
Andrew Hendy, Hereditary Chief of Mosquitos, abdicated 1889.
Robert Henry Clarence, Hereditary Chief of Mosquitos, deposed 12 February 1894.

Mukhrani
Constantine IV, deposed on the annexation of his principality by the Tsar of Russia, 1801.

Mwali
1842–67 and 1871–78 Sultan Jumbe Fatima bint Abderremane Sultani of Mwali 1842–1867 and 1871–1878

N

Kingdom of Naples
Ferdinand IV, deposed 1806, restored 1815
Joseph Bonaparte, abdicated 1808
Joachim Murat, deposed 1815

Duchy of Nassau
Adolf, Duke of Nassau, deposed 1866

Nassau-Orange-Fulda
Prince Willem Frederik, Prince of Orange-Nassau, lost his territories in 1806

Sultanate of Ndzuwani
Abdallah II bin Alawi sultan of Ndzuwani 1816–1832, deposed or abdicated 1832, restored 1833, died 1836.
Saidi Alawi bin Abdallah sultan of Ndzuwani 1836–1837, deposed or abdicated 1837.

Neu-Leiningen
Ferdinand Karl III Wilhelm Leopold count of Neu-Leiningen 1798–1801, deposed or abdicated 1801, died 1813.

Negeri Sembilan
Paduka Sri Tuanku Raja Laboh, Yang di-Pertuan Besar of Negri Sembilan 1826–1831, deposed 1831

Kingdom of the Netherlands
William I, King of the Netherlands, abdicated 1840

Niu'atuputapu
Uiliame Latumailangi, 7th Ma'atu of Niu'atuputapu, ceded the island of Niu'atuputapu to King George Tupou I on 4 June 1862, when Niu'atuputapu became an integral part of the Kingdom of Tonga.

Norway
Frederick VI, King of Norway, deposed 1814.
Christian Frederick, King of Norway, abdicated 1814.

O

Prince-Bishopric of Osnabrück
Prince Frederick, Duke of York Prince-Bishop of Osnabrück 1764–1802, deposed as a result of the German Mediatisation, territory was mediated to Hanover.

Ottoman Empire
Selim III, deposed 1807.
Mustafa IV, executed 1808.
Abdulaziz, deposed 1876.
Murad V, deposed 1876.

Olbrück
Maximilian Friedrich of Olbrück, Baron of Olbrück. Deposed following the annexation of Olbrück by France in 1801.

Oman
Salim bin Sultan, Sayyid of Muscat and Oman. Deposed by his brother in 1806.
Salim bin Thuwaini, Sultan of Muscat and Oman. Deposed in 1868.

Oran
Mustafa Bey al-Manzalah wali of Oran 1802–1805, deposed or abdicated 1805,restored 1807, died 1807.

P

Prince-Bishopric of Paderborn
Franz Egon von Fürstenberg, prince-bishop Paderborn 1789–1802, deposed by the annexation by Prussia.

Papal States
Pope Pius VII, deposed as ruler of the Papal States 1809, restored 1814
Pope Pius IX, deposed as ruler of the Papal States 1870

Duchy of Parma
Charles II, Duke of Parma, deposed 1848, restored later that year, abdicated 1849
Robert I, deposed 1859, his duchy annexed to the Kingdom of Sardinia in 1860

Prince-Bishopric of Passau
Leopold Leonhard Raimund II von Thun, Prince-Bishop of Passau, 1796–1803.  Deposed following Passau's annexation by Salzburg.

Portugal
Pedro IV, abdicated 1826
Maria II, deposed 1828, restored 1834
Miguel, deposed 1834

Q

Quba Khanate
Husayn II Khan, Satyaq Khan of Quba. Deposed following the annexation of Quba by Russia in 1816.

Quedlinburg Abbey
Sophie Albertine of Sweden princess-abbes of Quedlinburg 1787–1803, deposed or abdicated 1803, died 1808.

Qusantine
Ahmed Bey Ben Abdullah el-Memlouk, Bey of Qusantine, deposed 1818, restored 1820.
Ahmed Bey ben Mohamed Chérif, Bey of Qusantine, deposed 1848.

R

Rai'atea
Tamatoa-a-tu (Tamatoa V), King of Ra'iatea and Taha'a, deposed on 1871.
Te-uru-ra'i Ari'i-mate Tamatoa-Tau-tu Tamatoa VI, King of Ra'iatea and Taha'a, deposed by the annexation of Ra'iatea and Taha'a by France, 16 March 1888.

Reuss-Schleiz
Heinrich XLII count of Reuss-Schleiz 1784–1802, deposed or abdicated 1802, died 1818.

Reuss-Lobenstein
Heinrich LXXII count of Reuss-Lobenstein, abdicated 1848, died 1853.

Romania
Alexandru Ion Cuza, deposed 1866.

Russian Empire

Paul I was assassinated in 1801.
Alexander II was assassinated in 1881.

Ryukyu Kingdom
Sho Tai, deposed and his kingdom abolished in 1879; died 1901.

S

Kingdom of Sardinia
Charles Emmanuel IV, abdicated 1802, died 1819
Victor Emmanuel I, abdicated 1821, died 1824
Charles Albert, abdicated 1849, died later that year

Saxe-Altenburg
Joseph, Duke of Saxe-Altenburg, abdicated 1848, died 1868

Saxe-Meiningen
Bernhard II, Duke of Saxe-Meiningen, abdicated 1866, died 1882

Serbia
Miloš Obrenović, deposed 1839, restored 1858
Michael Obrenović, deposed 1842, restored 1860
Alexander Karađorđević, deposed 1858.
Milan, abdicated 1889.

Shaki Khanate
Mustafa Salim Khan Bashchi of Shakki 1795–1806, deposed or abdicated 1806, died 1819.
Isma`il Khan of Shakki Bashchi of Shakki 1815–1819, deposed through the annexation by Russia.

Shewa
Haile Melekot, prince of Shewa, deposed 1859.
Seyfe Sahle Selassie, prince of Shewa, seized the throne 1859, deposed 1859, restored 1860.
Menelik II, emperor of Ethiopia, king of Shewa 1855–1856, deposed 1856, restored 1865 as king, terminated the separate state 1889 uniting it to Ethiopia where he ascended as emperor.

Spain
Charles IV, deposed 1808, briefly restored later that year before abdicating, died 1819
Ferdinand VII, deposed or abdicated 1808, restored 1813, died 1833
Joseph Bonaparte, deposed 1813
Isabella II, deposed 1868
Amadeo I, abdicated 1873

Sri Lanka
Sri Wikrama Rajasinghe, the last king in a 2500-year-old monarchy, deposed by the British in 1816. Deported to South India together will all claimants to the throne to extinguish the national royal line. Kept as a prisoner for 17 years where he died at the Vellor Fort at age 52.

Sungai Ujong
Dato' Muhammad Yusuf bin Hashim, 13th Undang of Luak of Sungai Ujong 1881–1889, deposed 1889.

Sudan
`Abd Allah of Sudan, Khalifa of Sudan, deposed 1898.

Svaneti
Constantine Dadeshkeliani, revolted against Russian rule, and was deposed, 11 September 1857.

Sweden
Gustav IV Adolf, King of Sweden, deposed 1809

T

Tahiti
Pōmare V, King of Tahiti 1877–1880.  Ceded Tahiti to France on 29 June 1880.

Trarza
`Umar Salum wuld `Umar, emir of Trarza 1886–1891, deposed or abdicated 1891.

Principality of Trinidad
James Harden-Hickey, king of Trinidad 1893–1895, deposed by British then Brazilian,  occupation.

Tulsipur
 "Chauhan" Raja Drig Narayan Singh of House of Tulsipur deposed following the 1857 Mutiny.

Grand Duchy of Tuscany
Ferdinand III, Grand Duke of Tuscany, deposed 1801, restored 1814
Charles Louis, King of Etruria, deposed 1807
Leopold II, Grand Duke of Tuscany, deposed 1849, restored later that year, abdicated 1859
Ferdinand IV, Grand Duke of Tuscany, deposed 1859, his Grand Duchy was annexed to the Kingdom of Sardinia in 1860

Kingdom of the Two Sicilies
Francis II of the Two Sicilies, deposed 1860/1861

U

V

Viet Nam
Cảnh Thịnh, Emperor of the Tây Sơn dynasty, overthrown and executed 1802
Dục Đức, Emperor of the Nguyễn dynasty, deposed and imprisoned in 1883
Hiệp Hòa, Emperor of the Nguyễn dynasty, deposed and killed in 1883
Hàm Nghi, Emperor of the Nguyễn dynasty, captured and forced into exile in 1888
Thành Thái, Emperor of the Nguyễn dynasty, deposed and forced into exile in 1907
Duy Tân, Emperor of the Nguyễn dynasty, deposed and forced into exile in 1916

W

Wassulu
Samori ibn Lafiya Ture, Fama of Wassulu 1870–1884, Almami of Wassulu 1884–1898.  Deposed 29 September 1898.

Prince-Bishopric of Worms
Karl Theodor von Dalberg, Prince-Bishop of Worms 1802–1803, deposed following the annexation by Hesse-Darmstadt.  Died 1817.

X

Y

Z

Sultanate of Zanzibar
Khalid bin Barghash of Zanzibar, Sultan of Zanzibar, deposed 1896.

Zemio
Zangabirou, ruler of  Zemio ? -ca. 1855, died ca. 1858

See also
List of monarchs who abdicated
List of monarchs who lost their thrones in the 18th century
List of monarchs who lost their thrones in the 17th century
List of monarchs who lost their thrones in the 16th century
List of monarchs who lost their thrones in the 15th century
List of monarchs who lost their thrones in the 14th century
List of monarchs who lost their thrones in the 13th century
List of monarchs who lost their thrones before the 13th century

19
 
Lists of 19th-century people